Lee Kaldor (born February 20, 1951) is an American politician who served in the North Dakota House of Representatives from the 20th district from 1988 to 1996, when he ran for governor, and again from 2004 to 2012. He is a member of the North Dakota Democratic-NPL Party.

References

1951 births
Living people
Democratic Party members of the North Dakota House of Representatives